Paulo Hernán Junior Hinostroza Vásquez (born 21 December 1993), known simply as Churrito Hinostroza, is a Peruvian professional footballer who plays as a midfielder who plays for Santos de Nasca of the Peruvian Segunda División.

Club career
Hinostroza first started his youth career in 2000 in the Cueto La Rosa youth academy, which is run by César Cueto and Guillermo La Rosa. Then in 2007 he joined Peruvian giants Alianza Lima. In 2011, he was promoted to Alianza Lima's reserve team. He made 15 appearances and scored one goal in the 2011 Reserve League season. Hinostroza made his Torneo Descentralizado league debut on 7 August 2011 in the 17th Round of the 2011 season away to Alianza Atlético. He entered the match late in the game for Junior Viza to wrap up the 2–0 win for his side.

On 21 December 2011, it was announced that Hinostroza joined Belgium club Zulte Waregem and signed a 4.5-year contract. He made his official debut on 18 March 2012 in a 2–0 home win against Mechelen.

References

1993 births
Living people
Footballers from Lima
Association football midfielders
Peruvian footballers
Peruvian Primera División players
Belgian Pro League players
Club Alianza Lima footballers
S.V. Zulte Waregem players
Club Deportivo Universidad de San Martín de Porres players
FBC Melgar footballers
Peruvian expatriate footballers
Expatriate footballers in Belgium